Murray Graham Mexted (born 5 September 1953) is a former New Zealand rugby union player who played 34 consecutive tests for the All Blacks from 1979 to 1985. He also played 38 non-test games including 7 as captain.  During his time with the All Blacks, he wore the Number eight jersey and was considered an excellent ball winner and an effective defender.

In 1986, his biography, Pieces of Eight, was published, and he married Miss Universe Lorraine Downes.  The couple separated in 1999.  In recent years, he has retained a high profile as a television colour commentator. Mexted's father, Graham Mexted, was also a New Zealand rugby union international who won one full cap in 1950. Prior to his rugby career, Mexted worked at his family's car dealership.

References

External links
 

1953 births
Living people
Rugby union players from Wellington City
People educated at Tawa College
New Zealand international rugby union players
New Zealand rugby union players
Wellington rugby union players
Rugby union number eights
New Zealand rugby union commentators
Sharks (Currie Cup) players